The 2012 Copa de la Reina de Baloncesto (Queen's Cup of Basketball) was the 50th edition of the Spanish women's basketball national cup. It was contested by the top four teams in the 2011–12 Liga Femenina de Baloncesto after Week 24 and took place on 10–11 March 2012 in Arganda del Rey, Madrid. The three matches were broadcast by Teledeporte and autonomical channels Canal 9, TV3 and CYLTV.

2011 Euroleague and Spanish League champion CB Avenida won its third cup by beating 68–57 favorite Ros Casares. Defending champion BC Rivas was defeated by Ros Casares in the semifinals, while Uni Girona made its debut in the competition.

Results

Semifinals

Final

References

2012 
2011–12 in Spanish women's basketball
2011–12 in Spanish basketball cups